The 2017–18 SPFL Development League was the 20th season of the highest youth Scottish football league and the fourth season under the "Development League" format. It began on 21 August 2017, and concluded on 7 May 2018.

Changes
For the 2017–18 season of the Development League, three teams chose to withdraw from the competition. Dunfermline Athletic announced in May 2017 that due to the proposals made under 'Project Brave', which would see the implementation of a reserve league from the 2018–19 to replace the Development League, the club would not participate in the final year of the competition. Rangers also announced their intention to withdraw from the competition, instead receiving permission from the SPFL to take part in a programme of fixtures against a number of European elite youth teams, for example, Manchester United, Benfica and Bayern Munich. Inverness Caledonian Thistle also withdrew from the 2017–18 competition.

Eligible players were those born in 1998 or later, but five players of any age were permitted in the matchday squad of 18.

Summary

League table

Matches
Teams play each other twice, once at home and once away.

Top scorers

References

External links
SPFL

Development
Development
SPFL Development League